The Secret Kingdom is  a British  television series which originally aired on BBC in eight episodes between 6 May and 24 June 1960. It is an adaptation of the 1938 novel of the same title by Walter Greenwood. The plot revolves around Paula Byron, from a working class family in Salford. It was directed and produced by Chloe Gibson.

All eight episodes are believed to be lost.

Main cast
 Maureen Pryor as  Paula Byron
 Anthony Newlands as Henry Waring
 Anne Godfrey as Viola Byron
 Sheila Manahan as Anne Byron
 John Stratton as Bert Treville
 Kevin Stoney as Boyo Doyle
 Malcolm Keen as William Byron
 Ray Brooks as Figgins
 David Phethean as Dick Marlowe
 Douglas Ives as Alf Briggs
 Richard Davies as  Rigby
 Marjorie Rhodes as Mrs. Lorimer

References

Bibliography
Baskin, Ellen . Serials on British Television, 1950-1994. Scolar Press, 1996.

External links
 

BBC television dramas
1960 British television series debuts
1960 British television series endings
1960s British drama television series
1960s British television miniseries
English-language television shows
Television shows based on British novels